Ptilimnium nuttallii, commonly called laceflower, is a species of plant in the family Apiaceae that is native to south-central United States.

It is an annual that produces white flowers in the spring.

References

Flora of the South-Central United States
Ptilimnium